Lee Edward Fowler (born 26 January 1969) is an English former footballer who played in the Football League for Stoke City, Preston North End and Doncaster Rovers.

Career
Fowler was born in Eastwood, Nottinghamshire and began his career at Stoke City. He made his debut for Stoke against Sheffield United in the Full Members Cup in 1986–87. He made his league debut the following season but didn't feature at all in 1988–89. He played 17 times in 1989–90 under new manager Alan Ball as Stoke suffered relegation to the Third Division. He played 22 matches in 1990–91 as Stoke finished in their lowest league position of 13th which cost Ball his job. New manager Lou Macari used Fowler as a winger in 1991–92 but he sustained injury in November 1991 and didn't make a return until May 1992 in the play-offs against Stockport County. Stoke lost 2–1 on aggregate and with Stoke preparing for another season in the third tier Fowler was sold to Preston North End.

At Deepdale Fowler became regular left back and in his only season he played 36 times scoring three goals which came against Mansfield Town, Blackpool and Bradford City. Preston were relegated in 1992–93 and he then played 11 matches for Doncaster Rovers in 1993–94 before leaving for non-league football with Halifax Town. After a short spell with the "Shaymen" he spent eight years with Telford United and ended his career with Heanor Town in November 2002

Career statistics
Source:

A.  The "Other" column constitutes appearances and goals in the Football League play-offs, Full Members Cup and Football League Trophy.

References

External links
 

1969 births
Living people
People from Eastwood, Nottinghamshire
Footballers from Nottinghamshire
English footballers
Association football defenders
Stoke City F.C. players
Preston North End F.C. players
Doncaster Rovers F.C. players
Halifax Town A.F.C. players
Telford United F.C. players
Heanor Town F.C. players
English Football League players